WrestleCon is an annual professional wrestling fan convention held each spring since 2013 by Highspots, a digital professional wrestling retailer. The event features guest appearances, question-and-answer sessions, and live matches. 

Traditionally, WrestleCon takes place during the weekend of, and either in or near the host city of WrestleMania - the flagship event of WWE and considered the biggest wrestling event of the year.

History and organization 
The inaugural WrestleCon was a collaboration between Highspots and WWNLive.com, taking place April 5–7, 2013 at the Meadowlands Expo Center in Secaucus, New Jersey during WrestleMania 29 weekend. The convention included appearances by Bruno Sammartino, Paul Orndorff, Demolition, Tito Santana, The Iron Sheik and more. It also featured live wrestling from five promotions – EVOLVE, Combat Zone Wrestling, SHIMMER, CHIKARA, and Dragon Gate USA.

In 2014, WrestleCon emanated from The Sugar Mill in New Orleans, Louisiana, and featured appearances by Bill Goldberg, Roddy Piper, Edge, and Bret Hart and Jim Neidhart together as the Hart Foundation. WWNLive and its affiliated promotions did not participate in WrestleCon in 2014, with the live wrestling portion of the convention being the inaugural WrestleCon Supershow headlined by Kevin Steen, Jeff Jarrett, Colt Cabana, Chris Hero, Drew Gulak, Masato Tanaka, The Suck Me Crew and more.

Beginning in 2018, the annual WrestleCon Supershow was rechristened the Mark Hitchcock Memorial SuperShow in honor of Mark Hitchcock, an artist and wrestling fan who assisted in DVD production for Highspots

Originally scheduled for April 2–5, the 2020 event was cancelled due to the COVID-19 pandemic.

Due to the lingering pandemic, WrestleCon was not held in 2021. It returned in 2022 during WrestleMania 38 weekend.

In 2022, Impact Wrestling began promoting events as part of WrestleCon, partnering with different promotions to produce "Multiverse" shows.

Supershow events

See also 
List of professional wrestling conventions

References

External links 
 

Professional wrestling conventions
Recurring events established in 2012